USS Cook (FF-1083) was a  built for the United States Navy by Avondale Shipyard, Bridge City, Louisiana.

The ship was named after Lieutenant Commander Wilmer P. Cook, USN, a Douglas A-4E Skyhawk aviator from Attack Squadron 155 aboard . On 22 December 1967, LCdr. Cook launched on a combat mission over North Vietnam. LCdr. Cook was killed when he ejected from his burning aircraft, a rescue helicopter was unable to recover his body when it came under heavy fire.

Design and description
The Knox-class design was derived from the  modified to extend range and without a long-range missile system. They displaced  at full load. Their crew consisted of 13 officers and 211 enlisted men.

The ships were equipped with one Westinghouse geared steam turbine that drove the single propeller shaft.

The Knox-class ships were armed with a 5"/54 caliber Mark 42 gun forward and a single 3-inch/50-caliber gun aft. They mounted an the 5-inch (127 mm) gun and the bridge. Close-range anti-submarine defense was provided by two twin  Mk 32 torpedo tubes. The ships were equipped with a torpedo-carrying DASH drone helicopter; its telescoping hangar and landing pad were positioned amidships aft of the mack. Beginning in the 1970s, the DASH was replaced by a SH-2 Seasprite LAMPS I helicopter and the hangar and landing deck were accordingly enlarged. Most ships also had the 3-inch (76 mm) gun replaced by an eight-cell BPDMS missile launcher in the early 1970s.

Construction and career 
Her keel was laid 20 March 1970, she was launched 23 January 1971 and delivered 9 December 1971. Cook was commissioned 18 December 1971 and decommissioned 30 April 1992. She was struck 11 January 1995 and disposed of through the Security Assistance Program (SAP), and transferred to Taiwan 29 September 1999. She served the Republic of China Navy (ROCN) as Hai-Yang (FFG-936) with additional re-modifications and retired May 2015 .Hai-Yang used as the target during the exercise in 2020. Sunk by F-16V as target 1 July 2020.

Notes

References

Further reading

External links

 
 Navsource images

 

Ships built in Bridge City, Louisiana
Knox-class frigates
1971 ships
Maritime incidents in 2020
Ships transferred from the United States Navy to the Republic of China Navy